Titwala railway station is a railway station in the Titwala town on the Central line of the Mumbai Suburban Railway network. It is located on the route between Kalyan and Kasara. Ambivli railway station is the previous stop and Khadavli railway station is the next stop.

Gallery

See also

 Siddhivinayak Mahaganapati Temple

References

Railway stations in Thane district
Mumbai Suburban Railway stations
Mumbai CR railway division
Transport in Kalyan-Dombivli
Kalyan-Igatpuri rail line